Vision is an album by Indian violinist L. Shankar that was released by ECM in 1983. Shankar plays an electric violin that has two necks and ten strings. He is accompanied by saxophonist Jan Garbarek and trumpeter Palle Mikkelborg.

Reception

In a review for AllMusic, Richard S. Ginell called the album "an ethereal tour-de-force," and wrote: "Exotic pan-cultural ingredients and all, Vision is reassuringly easy to listen to, undoubtedly aided by ECM's sweetly reverberant sound.

The Washington Post's J.D. Considine noted that Shankar's solo recordings "avoid entirely the excesses of fusion jazz," and instead "pursue a plangent serenity that, when it reaches the heights achieved throughout Vision..., suggests a transcendence unheard in jazz since John Coltrane's A Love Supreme."

A writer for The New York Times commented: "This is pleasant music for late-night dreaming, but unlike the quasi-meditative musical wallpaper one hears on so many ECM and Windham Hill albums, it is also music with substance and heart."

Track listing
"All for You" – 6:36
"Vision" – 13:44
"Astral Projection" – 5:47
"Psychic Elephant" – 11:54
"The Message" – 7:22

Personnel
 Shankar – 10-string double violin, percussion
 Palle Mikkelborg – trumpet, flugelhorn
 Jan Garbarek – soprano, tenor and bass saxophones, percussion

References

1983 albums
ECM Records albums
Lakshminarayana Shankar albums